USS Bellerophon may refer to:

 , one of 39 Achelous-class landing craft repair ships built for the United States Navy

Fictional vessels
 USS Bellerophon (NCC-62048), a fictional Nebula-class starship that appears in 1993's "Emissary" (Star Trek: Deep Space Nine)
 USS Bellerophon (NCC-74705), a fictional Intrepid-class starship that appears in 1999's "Inter Arma Enim Silent Leges" (Star Trek: Deep Space Nine)
 USS Bellerophon, a fictional expedition starship that is mentioned in the 1956 film ("Forbidden Planet").

See also